Borçka (or ) is a town in Artvin Province in the Black Sea region of Turkey, on the border with Georgia. It is the seat of Borçka District. Its population is 11,409 (2021).

Borçka is reached by a winding road up from the Black Sea coast, alongside the Çoruh River (Nigali valley). There is a medieval stone arched bridge across the river just west of the town.

Borçka Lake is a popular excursion from Artvin.

References

External links 
 the Municipality

Populated places in Artvin Province
Borçka District
Towns in Turkey